The 1996 Grand Prix motorcycle racing season was the 48th F.I.M. Road Racing World Championship season.

Season summary
Honda's Mick Doohan continued his domination of the 500 class with 8 victories. His Repsol Honda teammate, Àlex Crivillé beat him to the line twice in Austria and the Czech Republic. Luca Cadalora, now with the Kanemoto Honda team took two wins for the fourth consecutive year. Suzuki's hopes were dashed when Daryl Beattie suffered head injuries in a pre-season crash. He returned only to crash in Spain then two races later in France which effectively ended his career. Loris Capirossi won his first 500 Grand Prix when Crivillé collided with his teammate, Doohan on the last lap of the Australian round. A new European team made its debut with the Elf team using a Swissauto V4 sidecar engine in an ROC chassis. It proved to be fast but unreliable. Honda introduced the NSR500V, a V twin as a cost-effective alternative for privateer teams.

Max Biaggi claimed his third consecutive 250 championship for Aprilia. Haruchika Aoki repeated as the 125 champion for Honda. Newcomers winning their first Grands Prix were Norifumi Abe in the 500 class, Olivier Jacque in the 250 class and Valentino Rossi in the 125 class.

1996 Grand Prix season calendar
The following Grands Prix were scheduled to take place in 1996:

†† = Saturday race

Calendar changes
 The French Grand Prix moved from the Bugatti Circuit in Le Mans to the Circuit Paul Ricard due to overbid in Le Mans, the Bugatti Circuit returned in 2000.
 The Austrian Grand Prix returned from the calendar after a one-year absence and moved from the Salzburgring to the Österreichring, one year before the track was renamed as the A1-Ring.
 The Indonesian Grand Prix was added to the calendar.
 The Argentine Grand Prix was initially scheduled, but was eventually taken off the calendar.
 The European Grand Prix was renamed the Catalan Grand Prix.

Participants

500cc participants

Results and standings

Grands Prix

†† = Saturday race

500cc riders' standings

Scoring system
Points are awarded to the top fifteen finishers. A rider has to finish the race to earn points.

250cc riders' standings
Scoring system
Points are awarded to the top fifteen finishers. A rider has to finish the race to earn points.

125cc riders' standings

Scoring system
Points are awarded to the top fifteen finishers. A rider has to finish the race to earn points.

References
 Büla, Maurice & Schertenleib, Jean-Claude (2001). Continental Circus 1949-2000. Chronosports S.A. 

Grand Prix motorcycle racing seasons
Grand Prix motorcycle racing season